Iceland sent five athletes to the 1978 European Athletics Championships which took place 29 August–3 September 1978 in Prague. Iceland won no medals at the Championships.

References 

Nations at the 1978 European Athletics Championships
Iceland at the European Athletics Championships
1978 in Iceland